Mike Lilly (May 24, 1950 – February 12, 2020) was an American banjoist and singer.

Discography

 Mike Lilly & Wendy Miller: LP Albums and contributions
 1972 New Grass Instrumentals (LP) Old Homestead Records, OHS 90017
 1973 Solid Grass (LP) Old Homestead Records, OHS 90029
 1975 Country Grass (LP) Old Homestead Records, OHS 90049 
 1976 Hot-N-Grassy (LP) Old Homestead Records, OHS 90068
 1977 4x Contribution in: Banjo Paris Session Volume 2 (LP) Cezame, CEZ 1041 (Mike Lilly on tracks: A6, B1,B2,B3)
 1977 Vernon Mcintyre with Friends W.Miller & M.Lilly, Appalachian Grass (LP) Old Homestead Records, OHS 90080
 Mike Lilly And The Country Grass
 1980 The House On The Hill (LP ) Old Homestead Records, OHS 90128
 1985 Looking For A New Way To Go (LP) Old Homestead Records, OHS-90127
 Harley Allen & Mike Lilly
 1985 - Suzanne (LP) Folkways Records, FTS 31049
 with  Larry Sparks And The Lonesome Ramblers
 1971 New Gospel Songs (LP) Pine Tree Records – PTSLP 507 
 1972 Bluegrass Old And New (LP) Old Homestead Records, OHS 90004
 1972 Ramblin' Bluegrass (LP) Starday Records, 480-498
 1975 Pickin' & Singin''' (LP) King Bluegrass Records, KB-519 
 1975 Sparklin' Bluegrass (LP) King Bluegrass Records, KB-531 
 1976 You Could Have Called (LP) King Bluegrass Records, KB 550 
 1976 Thank You Lord (LP) Old Homestead Records, OHS 90060
 1982 Where The Dim Lights Are The Dimmest (LP) Old Homestead Records, OHS 90147
 1982 Dark Hollow, (LP, Compilations) Rebel Records, REB-1597
 1982 Best Of Larry Sparks And The Lonesome Ramblers (LP, Compilations) Rebel Records, REB-1609  (Mike Lilly on tracks: A1, A2, A6, B1, B2, B5) 
 1983 The Testing Times'' (LP) Rebel Records REB-1611 (Mike Lilly on tracks: A4, B3)

References

1950s births
2020 deaths
People from Harlan, Kentucky
American banjoists
Bluegrass musicians from Kentucky
20th-century American singers
21st-century American singers